The Mumbai Chhatrapati Shivaji Maharaj Terminus–Bidar Superfast Express is a Superfast train belonging to Central Railway zone that runs between Chhatrapati Shivaji Maharaj Terminus and  in India. It is currently being operated with 22143/22144 train numbers on tri-weekly basis.

Service

22143/Mumbai Chhatrapati Shivaji Maharaj Terminus–Bidar Superfast Express has an average speed of 55 km/hr and covers 672 km in 12h 15m.
22144/Bidar–Mumbai Chhatrapati Shivaji Maharaj Terminus Superfast Express has an average speed of 55 km/hr and covers 672 km in 12h 15m.

Route and halts 

The important halts of the train are:

 
  Central

Coach composition

The train has standard ICF – CBC rakes with max speed of 110 kmph. The train consists of 19 coaches:

 1 First AC and AC II Tier
 1 AC II Tier
 2 AC III Tier
 8 Sleeper coaches
 5 General Unreserved
 2 Seating cum Luggage Rake

Traction

Both trains are hauled by a Kalyan Loco Shed-based WDG-3A or WDP-4D diesel locomotive from Mumbai to Bidar and vice versa.

Rake sharing

The train shares its rake with 22107/22108 Latur–Mumbai Express.

See also 

 Chhatrapati Shivaji Maharaj Terminus
 Bidar railway station
 Mumbai CSMT–Latur Superfast Express

Notes

References

External links 

 22143/Mumbai CSMT–Bidar Superfast Express India Rail Info
 22144/Bidar–Mumbai CSMT Superfast Express India Rail Info

Transport in Mumbai
Transport in Bidar
Express trains in India
Rail transport in Maharashtra
Rail transport in Karnataka